Vietnamese Constitutional Monarchist League (VCML) is a monarchist and anti-communist organization that seeks to restore the Nguyễn dynasty to the throne under a constitutional monarchy, as in Cambodia and Thailand. The VCML's position is that Emperor Bảo Đại was the last legitimate ruler of Vietnam. Bảo Đại and his children do not support the VCML or their political aspirations.

History 

The VCML was established in 1993 by its first President Nguyễn Phúc Bửu Chánh a member of the Vietnamese royal family who fled from Vietnam for political reasons after 1975.

Bảo Đại lived in Europe until his death on 30 July 1997. His son, Crown Prince Bảo Long, intentionally remained out of politics and lived quietly in Paris, France until his death on 28 July 2007. His brother, Prince Bảo Thăng, did not support the VCML until his death on 15 March 2017. The position of Head of the Imperial House is now held by Prince Phúc Bảo Ngọc.

Politics 
The VCML believes that "only the limited monarchy of the Imperial Nguyen Dynasty can succeed in preserving the cultural independence of Vietnam" and that "only a government that upholds Vietnamese nationalism and personal freedom can fully succeed in restoring the nation".

The VCML has repeatedly denounced the communist government of Vietnam over alleged corruption and human rights abuses.

External links 

The Vietnamese Constitutional Monarchist League

References 

Monarchism in Vietnam
Anti-communism in Vietnam
Anti-communist organizations
Monarchist parties
Overseas Vietnamese organizations
Organizations established in 1993
1993 establishments in the United States
Vietnamese democracy movements
Conservatism in Vietnam